Per Vilhelm Rudolf "Preven" Svedberg (19 August 1910 – 24 June 1992) was a welterweight Greco-Roman wrestler from Sweden. He won gold medals at the 1936 Summer Olympics and 1935 European Championships, finishing second in 1938. Between 1934 and 1944 he won ten national titles.

After retiring from competitions Svedberg worked with the national team, first as an assistant coach, in 1945-56 under Robert Oksa, and then as the head coach from 1956 to 1972.

References

1910 births
1992 deaths
Swedish wrestlers
Wrestlers at the 1936 Summer Olympics
Swedish male sport wrestlers
Olympic wrestlers of Sweden
Olympic gold medalists for Sweden
People from Sundsvall
Olympic medalists in wrestling
Medalists at the 1936 Summer Olympics
Sportspeople from Västernorrland County